This is a list of Algerian football transfers in the 2020–21 winter transfer window by club. clubs in the 2020–21 Algerian Ligue Professionnelle 1 are included.

Ligue Professionnelle 1

AS Ain M'lila

In:

Out:

ASO Chlef

In:

Out:

CA Bordj Bou Arreridj

CR Belouizdad

In:

Out:

CS Constantine

ES Sétif

In:

Out:

JS Kabylie

In:

Out:

JS Saoura

MC Alger

In:

Out:

MC Oran

NA Hussein Dey

NC Magra

Paradou AC

In:

Out:

USM Alger

In:

 

 

Out:

US Biskra

USM Bel Abbès

In:

Out:

Olympique de Médéa

In:

Out:

WA Tlemcen

JSM Skikda

In:

Out:

RC Relizane

References

Algeria
Lists of Algerian football transfers
2020–21 in Algerian football